George Cannon may refer to:

George Cannon (publisher) (1789–1854), English radical publisher and pornographer
George Cannon (wrestler) (1932–1994), Canadian wrestler
George H. Cannon (1915–1941), United States Marine and Medal of Honor recipient
George I. Cannon (1920–2009), leader in The Church of Jesus Christ of Latter-day Saints
George Q. Cannon (1827–1901), early member of the Quorum of the Twelve Apostles and First Presidency of The Church of Jesus Christ of Latter-day Saints
George Mousley Cannon (1861–1937), first president of the Utah State Senate
George W. Cannon (died 1897), American inventor
George Cannon (footballer) (1891–1951), English football inside right